

The Royal Society University Research Fellowship (URF) is a research fellowship awarded to outstanding early career scientists in the United Kingdom who are judged by the Royal Society to have the potential to become leaders in their field. The research fellowship funds all areas of research in natural science including life sciences, physical sciences and engineering, but excluding clinical medicine.

The URF scheme provides the opportunity for fellows to build an independent career in scientific research. Fellows are expected to be strong candidates for permanent faculty posts and academic tenure in universities at the end of their fellowships. , the fellowship funds up to 80% of basic salary costs for the awardee, with the other 20% usually provided by the University hosting the fellow.

Fellowships are awarded annually. In 2016, there were 25 universities across the UK and Ireland hosting 44 newly appointed University Research Fellowships. In 2015, the success rate of applications was 8%.

Notable fellows
, examples of current and former Fellows include:
 Frances Ashcroft (1985–1990), Oxford
 Terri Attwood, University College London (1993-1999) University of Manchester 1999-2002
  Jean Beggs
 Sarah-Jayne Blakemore (2007–2013), University College London
 Richard Borcherds
 Sarah Bridle (2008–2012), University of Manchester
 Brian Cox (2005–2013), University of Manchester
 Gideon Davies (1996–2005), University of York
 Athene Donald (1983), University of Cambridge
 Rafal E. Dunin-Borkowski (2000-2007), University of Cambridge
 David Jones (1995–1999), University College London
 Andrew P. Mackenzie (1993–2001) University of Birmingham
 Zita Martins (2014–2017), Imperial College London
 Shahn Majid (1993-2003),
 Angela McLean, University of Oxford
  John Pethica
 Tanya Monro (2000-2005), for research at the University of Southampton
 Tom Sanders (2016-2019), University of Oxford
 Suzie Sheehy (2017 - ) for research at the University of Oxford
 Nigel Scrutton (1991-1999) for research at University of Cambridge and University of Leicester
 Beth Shapiro (2006-2007), University of Oxford
 Stephen Warren,
 David J. Wales (1991-1998), University of Cambridge
 Kathy Willis
Tara Shears (2000-2008)

References

Fellowships
Innovation in the United Kingdom
Research and development in the United Kingdom
Royal Society
Universities in the United Kingdom